George Hurd is an American composer whose work focuses primarily on electroacoustic music combining classical instrumentation and electronics. He has also written a substantial amount of music for solo electronics and classical chamber ensemble. He is based in San Francisco, CA and heads The Hurd Ensemble, a chamber group dedicated to performing his pieces. A large portion of his work is concert music for The Hurd Ensemble and other groups, and music for dance, most notably having collaborated with choreographer Loni Landon and LEVYdance on Meet Me Normal  (2014) and the murmur of yearning for Kinetech Arts.

He has launched a travel-based composition project called Echolocation  based on his travels throughout Europe using location-specific sound-recordings to write pieces about each place he visited.

In July 2016 he released Nightmare Light, the self-titled all-electronic EP with fellow composer Joel St. Julien.

Electroacoustic Music
His most notable work includes the body of electro-acoustic music written for his group, The Hurd Ensemble, namely the pieces included on his 2016 Innova Recordings album, Navigation Without Numbers, which includes 11 pieces for combinations of violin, viola, cello, bass, piano, vibes, harp, and electronics, as well as a piece - also entitled Navigation Without Numbers - for solo violin and electronics written for and recorded by violinist/composer Carla Kihlstedt. In July 2016 The Hurd Ensemble performed at Kennedy Center in Washington D.C., a special request of Kennedy Center composer-in-residence Mason Bates.

Additionally, Hurd composed a piece for piano and electronics entitled Vivarium, for pianist Elyse Weakley. It premiered in March 2015 alongside pieces by Mason Bates, Aphex Twin and Anna Clyne.

Music for Film
Hurd's most substantial film score is for the feature-length documentary Freeing Bernie Baran<ref>Freeing Bernie Baran IMDB page: https://www.imdb.com/title/tt1770682/fullcredits?ref_=tt_cl_sm#cast</ref>, directed by Daniel Alexander. He also scored the shorts Jessica's Gift  and An Ordinary Moment  for filmmaker Joseph Voves. An Ordinary Moment won for Best Original Music at the 2006 Chicago 48-Hour Film Festival.

Music for DanceMeet Me Normal - LEVYdance and choreographer Loni Landon (AMP 2014 - ODC Theater, San Francisco - November 9, 2014)the murmur of yearning  - Kinetech Arts (2015)

Awards and commissions
Commission for Undercover Music Series. Morning Bell by Radiohead arranged for violin, viola, cello, bass, bass clarinets, piano, steel pans, vibraphone, singer and electronics. 
Composer's Residency, 2011 - New Spectrum Foundation - New York NY: Awarded a composer's residency at the New Spectrum Foundation in New York, NY from Oct 2011 - Jan 2012. Composed "Navigation Without Numbers", a single-movement piece for solo violin and electronics written for violinist/composer Carla Kihlstedt. 
Commission from Musiktheater Im Revier Gelsenkirchen, Germany, 2010. Two pieces for the Internetoper project: "Fulcrum" and "Flux" for violin, cello, bass clarinet, piano, vibraphone and electronics.
Winner of Best Music: 48 Hour Film Competition - Chicago 2006

DiscographyNavigation Without Numbers (Innova Recordings, 2016)Nightmare Light'' (Self-Released, 2016)

References

External links
George Hurd Official Website
Navigation Without Numbers - Innova Recordings
Hurd Ensemble website

American classical composers
Composers from San Francisco
American male composers
21st-century American composers
Year of birth missing (living people)
Living people
Classical musicians from California
21st-century American male musicians